Ultimate Weapon may refer to:

Film and television
 The Ultimate Weapon, a 1998 film starring Hulk Hogan
 Arrow: The Ultimate Weapon or War of the Arrows, a 2011 South Korean historical action film
 "Ultimate Weapon" (Ben 10), a 2006 television episode
 "Ultimate Weapon" (Double the Fist), a 2008 television episode
 "The Ultimate Weapon" (The Transformers), a 1986 television episode
 Ultimate Weapons, a show formerly on the Military Channel

Literature
 The Ultimate Weapon, a 1936 novel by John W. Campbell
 She, The Ultimate Weapon or Saikano, a 1999–2001 manga by Shin Takahashi
 Ultimate Weapon X, a fictional organization in the Ultimate Marvel Comics universe

Other uses
 Ultimate Weapon, a monument at Fort Dix, New Jersey, US
 Ultimate Weapon, an electric guitar model produced by James Tyler Guitars

See also 
 Doomsday machine (disambiguation)